The knockout phase of the 2011–12 UEFA Champions League began on 14 February with the round of 16, and concluded on 19 May 2012 with the final at Allianz Arena in Munich, Germany.

Times are CET/CEST, as listed by UEFA (local times are in parentheses).

Round and draw dates
All draws were held at UEFA headquarters in Nyon, Switzerland.

Format
The knockout phase involved the sixteen teams who finished in the top two in each of their groups in the group stage.

Each tie in the knockout phase, apart from the final, was played over two legs, with each team playing one leg at home. The team that had the higher aggregate score over the two legs progressed to the next round. In the event that aggregate scores finished level, the away goals rule was applied, i.e. the team that scored more goals away from home over the two legs progressed. If away goals were also equal, then thirty minutes of extra time were played, divided into two fifteen-minutes halves. The away goals rule was again applied after extra time, i.e. if there were goals scored during extra time and the aggregate score was still level, the visiting team qualified by virtue of more away goals scored. If no goals were scored during extra time, the tie was decided by a penalty shoot-out. In the final, the tie was played as a single match. If scores were level at the end of normal time in the final, extra time was played, followed by penalties if scores remained tied.

In the draw for the round of 16, the eight group winners were seeded, and the eight group runners-up were unseeded. A seeded team was drawn against an unseeded team, with the seeded team hosting the second leg. Teams from the same group or the same association could not be drawn against each other. In the draws for the quarter-finals onwards, there were no seedings, and teams from the same group or the same association could be drawn with each other.

Qualified teams

Bracket

Round of 16
The first legs were played on 14, 15, 21 and 22 February, and the second legs were played on 6, 7, 13 and 14 March 2012.

|}

Matches

1–1 on aggregate. APOEL won 4–3 on penalties.

Chelsea won 5–4 on aggregate.

Milan won 4–3 on aggregate.

Bayern Munich won 7–1 on aggregate.

Barcelona won 10–2 on aggregate.

Real Madrid won 5–2 on aggregate.

Benfica won 4–3 on aggregate.

2–2 on aggregate. Marseille won on away goals.

Quarter-finals
The first legs were played on 27 and 28 March, and the second legs were played on 3 and 4 April 2012.

|}

Matches

Real Madrid won 8–2 on aggregate.

Bayern Munich won 4–0 on aggregate.

Chelsea won 3–1 on aggregate.

Barcelona won 3–1 on aggregate.

Semi-finals
The first legs were played on 17 and 18 April, and the second legs were played on 24 and 25 April 2012.

|}

Matches

3–3 on aggregate. Bayern Munich won 3–1 on penalties.

Chelsea won 3–2 on aggregate.

Final

Notes

References

External links
2011–12 UEFA Champions League, UEFA.com

Knockout phase
2011-12